Maude Annabelle Apatow (born December 15, 1997) is an American actress, best known for portraying Lexi Howard in the HBO drama series Euphoria (2019–present).

She is the elder daughter of filmmaker Judd Apatow and actress Leslie Mann. Apatow began her career playing the daughter of her mother's characters in her father's films Knocked Up (2007), Funny People (2009), and This Is 40 (2012).

Apatow gained further recognition for her roles in the films Other People (2016), The House of Tomorrow (2017), Assassination Nation (2018), and The King of Staten Island (2020) and the Netflix miniseries Hollywood (2020).

Early life and education
Apatow's mother is actress Leslie Mann and her father is director, producer, and screenwriter Judd Apatow. Her father's family is Jewish, whereas her maternal great-grandmother was of Finnish ancestry. She has a younger sister, Iris Apatow, who is also an actress. She attended the Crossroads School, a private school in Santa Monica, California. Maude also attended Interlochen Arts Camp in Interlochen, Michigan. In high school, Apatow appeared in musicals such as Cabaret and Into the Woods. She studied theatre at Northwestern University in Evanston, Illinois, but dropped out after her sophomore year.

Career

2005–2015
Apatow began acting at the age of seven with a role in her father Judd Apatow's 2005 comedy film The 40-Year-Old Virgin, though her scenes ultimately did not make the film's final cut. She then appeared in the 2007 film Knocked Up, which was also written, produced, and directed by her father. She and her younger sister Iris Apatow played Sadie and Charlotte, respectively, the daughters of their real-life mother Leslie Mann's character. She again appeared alongside her sister as the daughter of Mann's character in her father's 2009 film Funny People, playing the role of Mable. Apatow reprised her Knocked Up role in the 2012 spin-off sequel This Is 40, starring Mann and Paul Rudd's characters. For her performance in the film as Sadie, Apatow was nominated for the 2012 Phoenix Film Critics Society Award for Best Young Actress and the 2013 Young Artist Award for Best Performance in a Feature Film - Supporting Young Actress.

After joining Twitter, Apatow was noted to have a large online following, which helped her become a contributor to Zooey Deschanel's website Hello Giggles as a writer and interviewer. Her work on the site as well as her acting roles earned her a spot on the Forbes 30 Under 30 list in 2012. Apatow's Twitter account was named one of the "Best Twitter Feeds of 2013" by Time magazine. In 2015, Apatow played an audience member in the film Pitch Perfect 2. That same year, she also recurred in the fourth season of the HBO comedy series Girls as Cleo. She appeared in three episodes of the series, on which her father was an executive producer.

2016–present
Apatow appeared as Alexandra Mulcahey in the 2016 comedy-drama film Other People, which was her first large role in a film not involving her father. In 2017, she played the role of Meredith Whitcomb in the film The House of Tomorrow and made her directorial debut with the short film Don't Mind Alice, which she co-wrote and co-directed alongside Olivia Rosenbloom.

The following year in 2018, Apatow starred as Grace in the film Assassination Nation. The film's director, Sam Levinson, subsequently cast Apatow as a series regular in his HBO teen drama series Euphoria, which debuted in 2019; where she stars as Lexi Howard in the series, a role that Levinson wrote specifically for Apatow. In 2020, she co-starred in her father's comedy-drama film The King of Staten Island, as the sister of Pete Davidson's character.

Apatow made her New York theatrical debut Off-Broadway in 2023, replacing Lena Hall as Audrey in a revival of Alan Menken and Howard Ashman's Little Shop of Horrors, with a planned stint from February to April.

Filmography

Film

Television

Theatre

Accolades

References

External links
 
 

1997 births
Living people
21st-century American actresses
American child actresses
American film actresses
American people of Finnish descent
American people of Jewish descent
American television actresses
Crossroads School alumni
Film child actresses
Northwestern University alumni